Lowney may refer to:

Lowney, West Virginia, an unincorporated community in the United States
Declan Lowney (born 1960), Irish television and film director
Garrett Lowney (born 1979), American Greco-Roman wrestler
Paul B. Lowney (1917–2007), American author and humorist
The Walter M. Lowney Company of Canada, maker of Cherry Blossom (candy)